Marina Hands (born 10 January 1975) is a French stage and film actress. Hands is the daughter of British director Terry Hands and French actress Ludmila Mikaël, and the granddaughter of Ukrainian-Greek painter . She studied acting at the Cours Florent and the CNSAD in France, and the London Academy of Music and Dramatic Art in England.

Life and career 
In 1999, she made her stage debut in Le Bel Air de Londres by Dion Boucicault, and was nominated for a Molière Award. Her first film was Andrzej Żuławski's La Fidélité (2000), followed by The Barbarian Invasions (2003). She then appeared in Les Âmes grises (2005), for which she was nominated for the César Award for Most Promising Actress, and Ne le dis à personne (Tell No One) (2006).

Her most notable performance to date was in the title role of Lady Chatterley (2006), an adaptation of John Thomas and Lady Jane by D. H. Lawrence. Hands won the 2007 César Award for Best Actress for her performance.

In 2006, Hands became a company member of the Comédie-Française. In 2008, she was again nominated for a Molière Award for her play in Partage de midi.

In 2011, she starred in Claude Miller's film Voyez comme ils dansent.

In 2019, she played Elvira in the TV series Mythomaniac.

Theatre

Filmography

References

External links

1975 births
Actresses from Paris
Alumni of the London Academy of Music and Dramatic Art
Best Actress César Award winners
Best Actress Lumières Award winners
French film actresses
French stage actresses
Living people
French people of English descent
French people of Ukrainian descent
French people of Greek descent
Troupe of the Comédie-Française
20th-century French actresses
21st-century French actresses
French National Academy of Dramatic Arts alumni
Cours Florent alumni